Susan VandeWoude is an American veterinarian and researcher specializing in viral diseases of cats. She is currently serving as the Dean of Colorado State University's College of Veterinary Medicine and Biomedical Sciences and a member of the National Academy of Sciences.

Education and career 

VandeWoude grew up in Berryville, Virginia and received her B.S. in Chemistry from the California Institute of Technology. She graduated with her Doctor of Veterinary Medicine (DVM) degree in 1986 from the Virginia-Maryland College of Veterinary Medicine. She completed her post-doctoral fellowship at Johns Hopkins University School of Medicine, where she studied the virus associated with Borna disease. She joined the faculty of Colorado State University in 1990 and became a Diplomate of the American College of Laboratory Animal Medicine in 1991. She held the position of Director of Laboratory Animal Resources at Colorado State University from 2007-2011 and has been the Associate Dean for Research within the College of Veterinary Medicine and Biomedical Sciences. In July 2020, she will assume the position as the director of the Colorado State University One Health Institute, after completion of a Fulbright research scholarship in Australia.

Research interests 
VandeWoude studies viruses including Feline Immunodeficiency Virus, Feline Leukemia Virus, and Feline Foamy Virus that infect both domestic cats and wild felids, such as bobcats and pumas.

Honors and awards 

She has previously served as President of the American College of Laboratory Animal Medicine and the American Society of Laboratory Animal Practitioners. She has also been involved with leadership for the American Association of Veterinary Medical Colleges and the American Veterinary Medical Association. VandeWoude was elected to the National Academy of Sciences in 2019.

References

American veterinarians
Living people
Year of birth missing (living people)
California Institute of Technology alumni
Colorado State University faculty
Women veterinary scientists
Veterinary scientists
People from Berryville, Virginia
Place of birth missing (living people)
Members of the United States National Academy of Sciences